Botswana was represented at the 2006 Commonwealth Games in Melbourne by a xx-member strong contingent comprising 21 sportspersons and xx officials.

Medals

Silver
 Gable Garenamotse, Athletics, Men's Long Jump

Bronze
 Mmoloki Nogeng, Boxing, Bantamweight 54 kg

Results by event

Athletics
Gable Garenamotse 	
Johnson Kubisa 	
Gakologelwang Masheto 	
Tlhalosang Molapisi 	
California Molefe 	
Amantle Montsho 	
Oganeditse Moseki
Obakeng Ngwigwa 	
Onalenna Oabona 	
Onnanye Ramohube

Bowls
Tirelo Snankie Buckley
Lebogang Moroke  	
Ivy Malefsane Motlhatlhedi 	
Sheila Spring

Boxing
Men's Light Flyweight (– 48 kg)
Michael Rantsho 	

Men's Flyweight (– 51 kg)
Lechedzani Luza 	

Men's Bantamweight (– 54 kg)
Mmoloki Nogeng

Men's Featherweight (– 57 kg)
Thato Batshegi

Men's Lightweight (– 60 kg)
Gomotsang Gaasite 	

Men's Light Welterweight (– 64 kg)
Herbert Nkabiti 	

Men's Welterweight (– 69 kg)
Moabi Mothiba

See also
Botswana at the 2004 Summer Olympics
Botswana at the 2008 Summer Olympics

References
 Official results by country

Botswana at the Commonwealth Games
Nations at the 2006 Commonwealth Games
Commonwealth Games